The siege of Dresden was a siege during the German campaign of 1813 of the War of the Sixth Coalition.

Background
After the Battle of Dresden, Napoleon had ordered Laurent Gouvion Saint-Cyr, commanding XIV Corps, to garrison Dresden.

Siege
After the French defeat at the Battle of Leipzig the garrison of Dresden was cut off and eventually besieged by the Russian Corps commanded by Alexander Ostermann-Tolstoy which was joined on the 26th October by the Austrian IV Corps commanded by Johann von Klenau .

Surrender
Saint-Cyr surrendered to Klenau on the 11th November 1813. Alongside Saint-Cyr; 11 Divisional Generals, 19 Brigade Generals, 1,759 officers and 33,744 men were captured as well as 94 guns.

Notes

References

External links
 

Dresden
1813 in Saxony
Dresden
Dresden
Dresden
Dresden
Sieges of Dresden
Dresden